Untermeyer is a surname. Notable people with the surname include:

Chase Untermeyer (born 1946), former United States ambassador to Qatar
Jean Starr Untermeyer (1886–1970), American poet, translator, and educator
Louis Untermeyer (1885–1977), American poet, anthologist, critic, and editor
Bryna Ivens Untermeyer (1909–1985) wife of Louis Untermeyer
Esther Antin Untermeyer (died 1983), wife of Louis Untermeyer

See also
Untermyer (disambiguation)